1,3-Cyclohexanedione is an organic compound with the formula (CH2)4(CO)2.  It is one of three isomeric cyclohexanediones.  It is a colorless compound that occurs naturally.  It is the substrate for cyclohexanedione hydrolase.  The compound exists mainly as the enol tautomer.

Synthesis, structure, and reactivity
1,3-Cyclohexanedione is produced by semi-hydrogenation of resorcinol:
C6H4(OH)2  +  H2  →   C6H8O2

1,3-Cyclohexanedione exists in solution predominantly as the enol tautomer.

It reacts under acid catalysis with alcohols to 3-alkoxyenones. Its pKa is 5.26.  Treatment of the sodium salt of the enolate with methyl iodide gives 2-methyl-1,3-cyclohexanedione, which also exists predominantly as the enol.

Derivatives
Dimedone (5,5-dimethyl-1,3-cyclohexanedione) is a well established reagent.

Several herbicides against grasses are formal derivatives of 1,3-cyclohexanedione.  Examples of commercial products include cycloxydim, clethodim, tralkoxydim, butroxydim, profoxydim, and mesotrione.

References
 

Diketones